Battle of Gilford may refer to:

Battle of Gilford, a 1772 confrontation between the Hearts of Steel and the landlord of Gilford estate, County Antrim, Ireland.
Battle of Guilford Court House, an American Revolutionary War battle in 1781, Guilford County, North Carolina.